Arivaca Lake is located in southern Arizona,  south of Tucson near Arivaca, Arizona. In mid-1999, there was a total fish kill at this lake due to oxygen depletion. The facilities are maintained by the Arizona Game and Fish Department.

Fish species
Largemouth Bass
Sunfish
Channel Catfish

References

External links
Arizona Fishing Locations Map
Arizona Boating Locations Facilities Map
Video of Arivaca Lake

Reservoirs in Pima County, Arizona
Reservoirs in Arizona